Lucy Alexis Liu (born December 2, 1968) is an American actress. Her accolades include winning a Critics' Choice Television Award, two Screen Actors Guild Awards and a Seoul International Drama Award, in addition to nominations for a Primetime Emmy Award.

Liu has starred as Ling Woo in the television series Ally McBeal (1998–2002), Alex Munday in two Charlie's Angels films (2000 and 2003) and Joan Watson in the crime-drama series Elementary (2012–2019). Her film work includes starring in Payback (1999), Shanghai Noon (2000), Chicago (2002), Kill Bill: Volume 1 (2003), Lucky Number Slevin (2006), Watching the Detectives (2007), The Man with the Iron Fists (2012), and Set It Up (2018).

Liu provided voice acting for Master Viper in the Kung Fu Panda franchise (2008–2016) and Silvermist in the Tinker Bell series (2008–2014). Her other voice credits include Maya & Miguel (2004–2007), Mulan II (2004), as well as the English and Mandarin-dubbed versions of Magic Wonderland (2014) and The Tale of the Princess Kaguya (2013). Most recently, she has voiced Callisto Mal in the Disney-animated film Strange World (2022).

Early life

Lucy Liu was born in the New York City borough of Queens. In high school, she adopted a middle name, Alexis. She is the youngest of three children born to Cecilia, who worked as a biochemist, and Tom Liu, a trained civil engineer who sold digital clock pens. Liu's parents originally came from Beijing and Shanghai and immigrated to Taiwan as adults before meeting in New York. She has an older brother, John, and an older sister, Jenny. Her parents worked many jobs while Lucy and her siblings were growing up.

Liu has stated that she grew up in a diverse neighborhood. She learned to speak Mandarin at home and began studying English when she was five. She studied the martial art kali-eskrima-silat as a hobby when she was young. Liu attended Joseph Pulitzer Middle School (I.S.145), and graduated from Stuyvesant High School. She later enrolled at New York University and transferred to the University of Michigan in Ann Arbor, Michigan, where she was a member of the Chi Omega sorority and studied Asian languages and cultures.

Career

1990s 
At the age of 19, while traveling on the subway, Liu was discovered by an agent. She appeared in one commercial as a result. As a member of the Basement Arts student-run theater group, she auditioned in 1989 for the University of Michigan's production of Alice in Wonderland during her senior year of college. Although she had originally tried out for only a supporting role, Liu was cast in the lead. While in line to audition for the musical Miss Saigon in 1990, she told The New York Times, "There aren't many Asian roles, and it's very difficult to get your foot in the door." In May 1992, Liu made her New York stage debut in Fairy Bones, directed by Tina Chen.

Liu had small roles in films and TV, marking her debut. In 1992, she made her big-screen debut in the Hong Kong film Rhythm of Destiny, which starred Danny Lee and Aaron Kwok. In 1993, she appeared in an episode of L.A. Law as a Chinese widow giving her evidence in Mandarin. Liu starred on the sitcom Pearl, which lasted one season.  Shortly after the end of Pearl's run in 1997, Liu was cast in a role on Ally McBeal. Liu originally auditioned for the role of Nelle Porter (played by Portia de Rossi), and the character Ling Woo was later created specifically for her. Liu's part on the series was originally temporary, but high audience ratings secured Liu as a permanent cast member. Additionally, she earned a Primetime Emmy Award nomination for Outstanding Supporting Actress in a Comedy Series and a Screen Actors Guild Award nomination for Outstanding Performance by a Female Actor in a Comedy Series.

2000s 
In 2000, Liu starred in Charlie's Angels along with Drew Barrymore and Cameron Diaz. In 2001, Liu was the spokeswoman for the Lee National Denim Day fundraiser, which raises money for breast cancer research and education. In 2004 Liu was appointed an ambassador for U.S. Fund for UNICEF. She traveled to Pakistan and Lesotho, among several other countries. In 2002, Liu played Rita Foster in Vincenzo Natali's Brainstorm. She appeared as O-Ren Ishii in Quentin Tarantino's 2003 film, Kill Bill. While in negotiations for Kill Bill with Tarantino the two joined to help produce the Hungarian sports documentary Freedom's Fury. She won an MTV Award for Best Movie Villain for her part in Kill Bill. Subsequently, Liu appeared on several episodes of Joey with Matt LeBlanc, who played her love interest in the Charlie's Angels films. She also had minor roles as Kitty Baxter in the film Chicago and as a psychologist opposite Keira Knightley in the thriller Domino. In Lucky Number Slevin, she played the leading love interest to Josh Hartnett. 3 Needles was released on December 1, 2006, Liu portrayed Jin Ping, an HIV-positive Chinese woman.

Liu had previously presented her artwork under a pseudonym, Yu Ling (which is her Chinese name). Liu, who is an artist in several media, has had several gallery shows showcasing her collage, paintings, and photography. She began doing collage mixed media when she was 16 years old, and became a photographer and painter. Liu attended the New York Studio School for drawing, painting, and sculpture from 2004 to 2006. In September 2006, Liu held an art show and donated her share of the profits to UNICEF. She also had another show in 2008 in Munich. Her painting, "Escape", was incorporated into Montblanc's Cutting Edge Art Collection and was shown during Art Basel Miami 2008, which showed works by contemporary American artists. Liu has stated that she donated her share of the profits from the NYC Milk Gallery gallery show to UNICEF. In London, a portion of the proceeds from her book Seventy Two went to UNICEF.

Early in 2006, Liu received an "Asian Excellence Award" for Visibility. She also hosted an MTV documentary, Traffic, for the MTV EXIT campaign in 2007. In 2008, she produced and narrated the short film The Road to Traffik, about the Cambodian author and human rights advocate Somaly Mam. The film was directed by Kerry Girvin and co-produced by photographer Norman Jean Roy. This led to a partnership with producers on the documentary film Redlight.

In 2007 Liu appeared in Code Name: The Cleaner; Rise: Blood Hunter, a supernatural thriller co-starring Michael Chiklis in which Liu plays an undead reporter (for which she was ranked number 41 on "Top 50 Sexiest Vampires"); and Watching the Detectives, an independent romantic comedy co-starring Cillian Murphy. She made her producer debut and also starred in a remake of Charlie Chan, which had been planned as early as 2000. In 2007 Empire named Liu number 96 of their "100 Sexiest Movie Stars". The producers of Dirty Sexy Money created a role for Liu as a series regular. Liu played Nola Lyons, a powerful attorney who faced Nick George (Peter Krause). Liu voiced Silvermist in Disney Fairies and Viper in Kung Fu Panda.

2010s 
In March 2010, Liu made her Broadway debut in the Tony Award–winning play God of Carnage as Annette on the second replacement cast alongside Jeff Daniels, Janet McTeer, and Dylan Baker. Liu is a supporter of marriage equality for same-sex marriage, and became a spokeswoman for the Human Rights Campaign in 2011. She has teamed up with Heinz to combat the widespread global health threat of iron deficiency anemia and vitamin and mineral malnutrition among infants and children in the developing world.

In March 2012, she was cast as Joan Watson for Elementary. Elementary is an American Sherlock Holmes adaptation, and the role Liu was offered is traditionally played by men. She has gained praise for her role as Watson, including three consecutive nominations for the People's Choice Awards for Favorite TV Crime Drama Actress. She also has played police officer Jessica Tang on Southland, a television show focusing on the lives of police officers and detectives in Los Angeles, as a recurring guest actor during the fourth season. She received the Critics' Choice Television Award for Best Drama Guest Actress for this role. Liu's other directorial credits include 6 episodes of Elementary, an episode of Graceland, the episode "Dearly Beloved" of Law & Order: Special Victims Unit, and the second-season premiere of Luke Cage.

In August 2011, Liu became a narrator for the musical group The Bullitts. In 2013, Liu was invited to become a member of the Academy of Motion Picture Arts and Sciences. Liu was named Harvard's 2016 Artist of the Year. She was awarded the Harvard Foundation's arts medal at the annual Harvard Foundation Award ceremony, during the Cultural Rhythms Festival in Sanders Theatre. She is also part of the cast in the post-apocalyptic thriller Future World, directed by James Franco and Bruce Thierry Cheung. Her first national museum exhibition was held at the National Museum of Singapore in early 2019 and was titled "Unhomed Belongings."

2020s 
In April 2021, Liu was cast as the villainess Kalypso in the upcoming superhero film Shazam! Fury of the Gods. In 2022, she was cast to voice a role in the Walt Disney Animation Studios film Strange World, and in Jake Kasdan's upcoming film Red One.

Personal life
In 1991, Liu underwent surgery after a breast cancer scare. "The doctor sort of felt and said it was cancer and it needs to come out. I went into shell-shock. It was pretty traumatizing." The lump was removed just two days after the doctor's examination and was found to be benign.

Liu has studied various religions, such as Buddhism, Taoism and Jewish mysticism. She has stated, "I'm into all things spiritual—anything to do with meditation or chants or any of that stuff. I studied Chinese philosophy in school. There's something in the metaphysical that I find very fascinating." She has been a member of the Chinese-American organization Committee of 100 since 2004.

Liu is a single parent. She has a son, Rockwell, who was born in 2015 via gestational surrogate. She has stated that surrogacy was the right option for her because, "I was working and I didn't know when I was going to be able to stop." She was involved in Tylenol's #HowWeFamily Mother's Day Campaign, which celebrated non-traditional families.

Liu has been vegetarian since childhood.

Filmography

Film

Television

Video games

Director

Art exhibitions

Awards and nominations

See also
 Chinese Americans in New York City

References

External links

 
 
 
 

Year of birth missing (living people)
Living people
Actresses from New York City
American actresses of Chinese descent
American artists of Chinese descent
American Buddhists
American film actresses
American film actors of Asian descent
American people of Chinese descent
American stage actresses
American television actresses
American video game actresses
American voice actresses
American women painters
Painters from New York City

Members of Committee of 100
New York University alumni
Outstanding Performance by a Cast in a Motion Picture Screen Actors Guild Award winners
People from Jackson Heights, Queens
Stuyvesant High School alumni
University of Michigan College of Literature, Science, and the Arts alumni
20th-century American actresses
21st-century American actresses
21st-century American painters
21st-century American women artists